Merryville is a town in Beauregard Parish, Louisiana, United States. The population was 1,103 at the 2010 census. It is part of the DeRidder Micropolitan Statistical Area.

Geography
Merryville is located at  (30.753916, -93.536991). U.S. Route 190 passes through the community, leading north and east  to DeRidder, the parish seat, and west  to Newton, Texas.

Demographics

As of the census of 2000, there were 1,126 people, 418 households, and 300 families residing in the town. The racial makeup of the town was 82.06% White, 15.19% African American, 1.24% Native American, 0.09% Asian, 0.27% from other races, and 1.15% from two or more races. Hispanic or Latino of any race were 3.46% of the population.

There were 418 households, out of which 34.9% had children under the age of 18 living with them, 50.2% were married couples living together, 17.7% had a female householder with no husband present, and 28.2% were non-families. 27.0% of all households were made up of individuals, and 10.8% had someone living alone who was 65 years of age or older. The average household size was 2.55 and the average family size was 3.10.

In the town, the population was spread out, with 28.0% under the age of 18, 9.4% from 18 to 24, 24.3% from 25 to 44, 21.8% from 45 to 64, and 16.4% who were 65 years of age or older. The median age was 36 years. For every 100 females, there were 81.0 males. For every 100 females age 18 and over, there were 78.2 males.

The median income for a household in the town was $22,500, and the median income for a family was $30,962. Males had a median income of $30,250 versus $18,672 for females. The per capita income for the town was $14,055. About 24.8% of families and 28.3% of the population were below the poverty line, including 34.8% of those under age 18 and 29.0% of those age 65 or over.

Notable people
Jesse Knowles
Sam H. Jones
Red Cagle
Jim McKeiver - Last football coach to have a winning season

References

External links
Town of Merryville official website
Merryville Museum

Towns in Beauregard Parish, Louisiana
Towns in Louisiana